Pseudognathobotys diffusalis is a moth in the family Crambidae. It was described by Koen V. N. Maes in 2001. It is found in Cameroon.

References

Spilomelinae
Moths described in 2001